Lac de Bise is a lake in Haute-Savoie, France. It is located within the commune of La Chapelle-d'Abondance, in the French Chablais, east of the Cornettes de Bise.

See also 
List of lakes of France

References

Bise